Monique Adamczak and Jessica Moore were the defending champions, but Adamczak chose to compete in Osaka instead. Moore played alongside Dalila Jakupović, but lost in the first round to Alexa Guarachi and Giuliana Olmos.

Peng Shuai and Laura Siegemund won the title, defeating Guarachi and Olmos in the final, 6–2, 6–1.

Seeds

Draw

Draw

References

Main Draw

Guangzhou International Women's Open - Doubles
2019 Doubles